Destry may refer to:

 Destry, Moselle, a French commune
 Destry Wright (born 1977), retired American football player
 Destry (band), an indie folk band
 Destry (film), a 1954 western starring Audie Murphy
 Destry (TV series), a 1964 western series starring John Gavin

See also 
 Destry Rides Again (disambiguation)